The role of the Ambassador and Permanent Representative of Germany to the United Nations is as the leader of the German delegation to the United Nations in New York City and as head of the Permanent Mission of the Federal Republic of Germany to the UN. The position has the rank and status of an Ambassador Extraordinary and Plenipotentiary and is also the representative of Germany in the United Nations Security Council.

The Permanent Representative, currently Antje Leendertse, is charged with representing Germany, both through its non-permanent seat on the U.N. Security Council and also during plenary meetings of the General Assembly, except in the rare situation in which a more senior officer (such as the Minister for Foreign Affairs or the President) is present.

History of representatives
The Federal Republic of Germany (West Germany) was admitted to the UN as an observer in 1955. The German Democratic Republic (East Germany) was admitted as an observer in 1972. On 18 September 1973 both were admitted as full members by the United Nations General Assembly, following the recommendation of the Security Council by Resolution 335 on 22 June 1973. Through the accession of the German Democratic Republic to the Federal Republic of Germany, it was effective on 3 October 1990.

Office holders

Ambassadors of the Federal Republic of Germany

Ambassadors of the German Democratic Republic

See also
Germany and the United Nations
Foreign relations of Germany

References

External links
Permanent Mission of Germany to the United Nations - New York

Permanent Representatives of Germany to the United Nations
Germany